Meyn may refer to:

People
 Erik Meyn (born 1955), Norwegian journalist, TV host and TV director
 Ludwig Meyn (1820–1878), German scientist
 Niels Meyn (1891–1957), Danish author
 Peter Meyn (1749–1808), Danish architect
 Robert Meyn (1896–1972), German actor
 Wilhelm Meyn (1923–2002), German general

Places
 Meyn, Schleswig-Holstein, Germany

Other
 Meyn Food Processing Technology